The 2021–22 North Dakota Fighting Hawks basketball team represented the University of North Dakota in the 2021–22 NCAA Division I men's basketball season. The Fighting Hawks were led by third-year head coach Paul Sather and played their home games at the Betty Engelstad Sioux Center in Grand Forks, North Dakota, as members of the Summit League.

Previous season
Under second-year head coach Paul Sather, the Fighting Hawks accumulated a record of 9–17 (8–8 Summit) and placed 5th overall in the conference, which was their highest finish in the conference since joining. The Fighting Hawks lost in the first round of the 2021 Summit League tournament to Oral Roberts who eventually made it to the Sweet Sixteen of the 2021 NCAA Division I men's basketball tournament.

Roster

Schedule and results

|-
!colspan=12 style=| Exhibition

|-
!colspan=12 style=| Non-conference regular season

|-
!colspan=12 style=| Summit League regular season

|-

References

North Dakota Fighting Hawks men's basketball seasons
North Dakota Fighting Hawks men's basketball
North Dakota Fighting Hawks men's basketball
North Dakota Fighting Hawks